Martin Oskar Johan Bengtsson (born 14 March 1986) is a Swedish former professional footballer who played as a midfielder.

Club career 
Bengtsson started playing football for IK Sturehov as a child and stayed with the club until he was signed by Örebro SK as a 15-year-old in 2002. He made his Allsvenskan debut at 17 years old for Örebro SK during the 2003 season in a game against Enköpings SK when he came on as a substitute for Mirza Jelecak. After the 2003 season, Bengtsson left Örebro SK to sign for the Serie A club Inter Milan. However, he left the Italian club after only nine months after suffering from depression.

In 2005, he signed for Örebro SK Ungdom in Division 2 Norra Svealand but only played for one season before retiring from professional football at the age of 19.

International career 
Bengtsson appeared 20 times for the Sweden U17 team, scoring three goals. He also appeared twice for the Sweden U19 team.

Personal life 
In 2007, he wrote the autobiography I skuggan av San Siro (English: In the shadow of San Siro) about his experiences as a young footballer at Inter Milan. In 2020, the book was adapted into a movie called Tigers directed by Ronnie Sandahl.

After quitting football, Bengtsson took up careers in journalism and music.

Career statistics

Club

International

References

External links

1986 births
Living people
Swedish footballers
Association football midfielders
Sweden youth international footballers
Allsvenskan players
Örebro SK players
Sportspeople from Örebro